Melaleuca hamulosa is a plant in the myrtle family, Myrtaceae and is endemic to the south-west of Western Australia. It is a broom-like shrub with many stiff, ascending branches and spikes of white or pale mauve flowers in spring or summer.

Description 
Its leaves are arranged alternately around the stem and are more or less pressed against it.

Taxonomy and naming
This species was first formally described in 1847 by the Russian botanist Nikolai Turczaninow in Bulletin de la Société Impériale des Naturalistes de Moscou. The specific epithet (hamulosa) is from the Latin word hamus meaning "a hook", "in reference to the recurved apex of the leaves of this species".

Distribution and habitat
Melaleuca hamulosa occurs in the Avon Wheatbelt, Coolgardie, Esperance Plains, Geraldton Sandplains, Jarrah Forest, Mallee and Yalgoo biogeographic regions. It grows in sandy soils, usually over clay in winter-wet depressions and swamps in kwongan or shrubland.

Conservation status
Melaleuca hamulosa is listed as "not threatened" by the Government of Western Australia Department of Parks and Wildlife.

References

hamata
Myrtales of Australia
Rosids of Western Australia
Plants described in 1847
Endemic flora of Western Australia
Taxa named by Nikolai Turczaninow